Dobrów may refer to the following places:
Dobrów, Greater Poland Voivodeship (west-central Poland)
Dobrów, Masovian Voivodeship (east-central Poland)
Dobrów, Świętokrzyskie Voivodeship (south-central Poland)